Perfect Wedding is a 2010 Hong Kong film co-produced by Shaw Brothers Studio, Television Broadcasts Limited and Sil-Metropole Organisation.

Cast
 Miriam Yeung as Suen Lok Yan (孫洛昕), a wedding planner of Perfect Wedding, Ling Yu Fung's girlfriend and Kelvin's ex-fiancé
 Raymond Lam as Ling Yu Fung (凌裕風), an Up & Down firm lawyer, Perfect Weddings wedding witness lawyer, Sister Cha's son and Suen Lok Yan's boyfriend
 Teresa Mo as Doris, senior manager of jewelry chain
 Eric Kot as Cheng Wing Hong (Kelvin) (鄭永康), an internationally renowned photographer, Suen Lok Yan's ex-boyfriend and ex-fiancé
 Chrissie Chau as Flora, a Perfect Wedding wedding planner
 Kate Tsui as Remmy, a spa owner
 Bernice Liu as Mimi, senior counsel
 Ngo Ka-nin as Wing, a Perfect Wedding wedding image consultant
 Océane Zhu as Fanny, the head flight attendant
 Mak Ling Ling (麥玲玲) as Sister Cha (叉姐), Ling Yu Fung's mother
 Wen Jia Ni (翁佳妮) as Little Princess (小公主), Perfect Wedding staff
 Richard Ng as Mr. Yeung (大楊生), Louis Yeung's father
 Ken Hung as Louis Yeung (小楊生), Mr. Yeung's son and Vivian's fiancé
 Kathy Yuen as Vivian, Louis Yeung's fiancé
 Tats Lau as Mr. Chiu (趙先生), Mrs. Chiu's fiancé
 Ankie Beilke as Mrs. Chiu (趙太), Mr. Chiu's fiancé
 Pamela Peck as a show hostess
 Samantha Ko, who is brought by Sister Cha to accompany Fung when he and Yan broke up

Awards and nominations
17th Hong Kong Film Critics Society Awards
 Won: Best Actress (Miriam Yeung)

External links
 
 
 Perfect Wedding 2010 review at LoveHKFim.com
 

2010 films
2010s Cantonese-language films
Hong Kong romantic comedy-drama films
2010 romantic comedy-drama films
Shaw Brothers Studio films
Films directed by Wong Chun-chun
2010 comedy films
2010 drama films
2010s Hong Kong films